Sammie is the self-titled second studio album by American singer Sammie, released by Rowdy Records on October 10, 2006 in the United States (see 2006 in music). The singer teamed with producers Bryan Michael Cox, Dallas Austin, Jazze Pha, Daron Jones, Adonis Shropshire and Novel.

The album garnered a mostly positive reception from music critics, and produced only two singles of which both failed to chart or sell noticeably. Soon considered a commercial failure, it reached the top ten of U.S. Billboard'''s Top R&B/Hip-Hop Albums chart at number eight, and number forty-two on the Billboard 200, selling over 20,000 copies in its first week. The album was released with as exclusive versions with different bonus track to Target, Best Buy, and Circuit City.

 Production and title 
After the success of his first album From the Bottom to the Top and a hiatus to finish high school, Sammie entered the recording studios in 2005 to start work on his self-titled second album with reteaming with producer Dallas Austin. Austin signed the then seventeen-year-old to his record label, Rowdy Records. The singer described the album as "soulful" and "passionate."

 Singles 
The album yielded two singles only: The album's lead single, "You Should Be My Girl", featuring Sean P of Youngbloodz, was a moderate success on the Billboard Hot R&B/Hip-Hop Songs chart peaking at number twenty-six and missing the Billboard Hot 100 peaking at number one hundred-four. The second single, "Come with Me" received the same success peaking at number twenty-three and one hundred-three on Billboard'' Hot R&B/Hip-Hop Songs and Hot 100. Though "Feelin' It" was considered to be released as the album's third single, it was not officially released.

Track listing

Personnel

Musicians
 Alonzo "Novel" Stevenson – keyboards
 Sammie – backing vocals
 Bryan-Michael Cox – programming
 Andre Harris – programming
 Jazze Pha – programming
 Tony Reyes – guitar
 Alonzo "Novel" Stevenson – backing vocals

Production
 Vocal producer – Vidal Davis, Daron Jones, Alonzo "Novel" Stevenson
 Engineers – Dru Castro, Steve Fisher, Carlton Lynn, Graham Marsh (producer), Alec Newell, Robert Root, Miles Walker
 Mixing – Vincent Dilorenzo, Carlton Lynn, Sam Thomas
 Mixing assistance – Tony Terrebonne, Mike Tsarfati
 A&R – Mike Tsarfati, Kim Smith
 Album coordinator – Candice Childress
 Sound design – Rick Sheppard

Charts

References

2006 albums
Sammie albums